of Japan, was the founder of a collateral branch of the Japanese imperial family.

Biography
Prince Hirotsune was the twelfth son of Prince Fushimi Kuniye (1802–1875).

Hirotsune's father was the twentieth head of the Fushimi-no-miya, which was the oldest of the four branches of the imperial dynasty allowed to provide a successor to the Chrysanthemum throne if the main imperial house should fail to produce an heir.

As he was born when the country was still under rule by the Tokugawa Bakufu, he was sent on 12 October 1852 into the Buddhist priesthood, and assigned to serve at the monzeki temple of Chion-in in Kyoto.

On 27 October 1860, he was recalled by Emperor Kōmei, who formally adopted him as a potential heir to the throne. However, a few months later that same year, the 14th Tokugawa Shōgun, Tokugawa Iemochi, requested that a prince from the imperial family be assigned to the Tokugawa household as potential heir to the Shogunate. Prince Hirotsune was chosen for this role, but remained in Kyoto.

The Meiji Restoration in 1868 eliminated the possibility that he would become Shōgun, and Prince Hirotsune returned to the Imperial household. Emperor Meiji granted him permission to start a new branch of the Imperial Family, and he took the name of Kachō-no-miya (from the mountain name of the temple of Chion-in).

Prince Hirotsune traveled to the United States. He studied at the United States Naval Academy at Annapolis in 1870, but fell ill and returned to Japan in 1872. On 13 May 1876, he was commissioned as a rear admiral in the Imperial Japanese Navy, but he died later that year.

His wife was Nambu Ikuko, daughter of Count Nambu Toshihisa, the last daimyō of Morioka Domain. The couple had one son, Prince Kachō Hiroatsu.

Notes

References
 Jansen, Marius B. (2000). The Making of Modern Japan. Cambridge: Harvard University Press. ;  OCLC 44090600
 Keene, Donald. (2002). Emperor of Japan: Meiji and His World, 1852-1912. New York: Columbia University Press. ; OCLC 46731178
 Lebra, Sugiyama Takie. Above the Clouds: Status Culture of the Modern Japanese Nobility. University of California Press (1995). 
 Nussbaum, Louis-Frédéric and Käthe Roth. (2005).  Japan encyclopedia. Cambridge: Harvard University Press. ;  OCLC 58053128

1851 births
1876 deaths
Kachō-no-miya
Japanese princes
People from Kyoto
Imperial Japanese Navy admirals
People of Meiji-period Japan